"Pussy & Millions" is a song by Canadian rapper Drake and Atlanta-based rapper 21 Savage from their collaborative studio album Her Loss (2022). It features American rapper Travis Scott and was produced by Cheeze Beatz, Go Grizzly, Squat Beats, B100 and Lil Yachty.

Content
The song centers on the wealth of the rappers and some problems resulting from it, as well as a "tale of love complexity". It references the song "Mo Money Mo Problems" by the Notorious B.I.G. with the lyrics "They say: mo money, mo problems / Bring on the problems".

Critical reception
Mosi Reeves of Rolling Stone regarded the song as one of the "clear standouts" on Her Loss. In an unfavorable response, Josh Svetz of Paste wrote that it "fails to make good on its star billing, putting 21 in an awkward situation where he tries to rap like Scott, but he can't pull off the lack of humanity Scott excels at."

Charts

References

2022 songs
Drake (musician) songs
21 Savage songs
Travis Scott songs
Songs written by Drake (musician)
Songs written by 21 Savage
Songs written by Travis Scott
Songs written by Lil Yachty